Hazony is a surname. Notable people with the surname include:

David Hazony (born 1969), American-born Israeli writer, translator, and editor
Yoram Hazony (born 1964), Israeli philosopher, Bible scholar, and political theorist